Wahlenbergia linifolia, the large bellflower, is a species of plant in the family Campanulaceae. It is endemic to Saint Helena.  Its natural habitat is rocky areas. It is threatened by habitat loss.

References

linifolia
Critically endangered plants
Flora of Saint Helena
Taxonomy articles created by Polbot